Taryn Leigh Foshee (born April 3, 1985), a Clinton, Mississippi native, is a beauty queen who won the 2003 Miss Clinton pageant while a pupil at Hillcrest Christian School and received a commendation from the Mississippi Legislature.

Subsequently, Foshee won the 2006 Miss Mississippi pageant, and later placed as third runner-up in the Miss America pageant on January 29, 2007, in Las Vegas, Nevada.

References

External links
 
 

Miss America 2007 delegates
People from Clinton, Mississippi
Living people
1985 births